Euastacus sulcatus, also known as the Lamington crayfish, is a freshwater crayfish, or "yabby", native to Australia. It is commonly bright blue in colour and roams the forest floor when conditions are damp. Red and white colour variants also exist.

Distribution
Restricted to streams bordered by rainforest and sometimes wet eucalyptus forest at more than 300 m altitude. Inhabits mountains in a crescent from Mount Tamborine to Lamington Plateau, west along Macpherson Range and north via Cunningham's Gap into the Mistake Mountains, Queensland.

Habitat
The species occurs in streams at altitudes above , in rainforest and sclerophyll forest.

References

Freshwater crustaceans of Australia
Crustaceans described in 1951
sulcatus